Prague 14 is a municipal district in Prague since 1994. It is located in the north-eastern part of the city, east of district Prague 9. It consists of four cadastres: Hloubětín (part), Kyje, Černý Most and Hostavice.

The administrative district (správní obvod) of the same name consists of municipal districts Prague 14 and Dolní Počernice.

Two notable historic buildings can be found in the district: Saint Bartholomew church in Kyje and Saint George church in Hloubětín, both founded in the 13th century.

See also
Districts of Prague#Symbols

External links 
 Prague 14 - Official homepage

Districts of Prague